Salaoua Announa  is a town and commune in Guelma Province, Algeria. It was called Thibilis during the Roman Empire.

References

Communes of Guelma Province